China Writers Association or Chinese Writers Association (CWA) is a subordinate people's organization of the China Federation of Literary and Art Circles (CFLAC). Founded in July 1949, the organization was initially named the China National Literature Workers Association. In September 1953, it was renamed the China Writers Association. The association's leadership was purged shortly after the 1989 Tiananmen Square protests and massacre. In April 2012, the organization changed its translated name to China Writers Association.

It now has more than 9,000 registered members, with branch associations across the nation. The first CWA Chair was Mao Dun, under the leadership of the then CFLAC Chairman Guo Moruo. In 1985, Mao Dun was succeeded by Ba Jin. The incumbent Chair is Tie Ning since 2006. Other successive Associate Chairs include Ding Ling, Feng Xuefeng, Lao She, Ke Zhongping, Shao Quanlin and Liu Baiyu.

Chairs and Vice-Chairs

Chairs
Mao Dun (1949–1981)
Ba Jin (1984–2005)
Tie Ning (2006–present)

Vice-Chairs
Note: The list is incomplete.

Lao She (1949–1966)
Zhou Yang (1949–1979)
Ding Ling (1949–1986)
Liu Baiyu (1953–1984)
He Jingzhi (1979–1984)
Ai Qing (1979–1996)
Lu Wenfu (1984–2001)
Wang Meng (1984–2006)
Li Zhun (1996–2000)
Ye Xin (1996–present)
Huang Yazhou (2001–2006)
Chen Zhongshi (2001–2016)
Zhang Ping (2001–2016)
Liu Heng (2006–present)
Wang Anyi (2006–present)
Zhang Kangkang (2006–present)
Mo Yan (2011–present)
Zhang Wei (2016–present)
Jia Pingwa (2016–present)

Controversy 
In 2017, two vice presidents of the Suzhou branch of the CWA publicly resigned as a protest to what they perceived as the Chinese Communist Party's tightening of control on writers.

Publications 
The Chinese Writers' Association publishes several magazines, including 《人民文学》 Renmin wenxue (People's Literature) (monthly), 《中国作家》 Zhongguo zuojia (Chinese Writer) (bimonthly), 《诗刊》 Shi kan (Poetry) (monthly), 《民族文学》 Minzu wenxue (Folk Literature) (monthly), 《小说选刊》 Xiaoshuo xuankan (Selected Novels) (monthly), and Newspaper of Art (weekly). Its publishing arm is the Chinese Writers Publishing House. It also issues 《文艺报》 Wen yi bao (Literature and Art Newspaper) (currently three times a week).

Bibliography

References 

Chinese writers' organizations
Arts organizations established in 1949
1949 establishments in China
Organizations associated with the Chinese Communist Party